The Falémé River is a river in West Africa. The Falémé arises in northern Guinea and flows in a north-northeast direction to Mali, forming a short portion of the border between Guinea and Senegal. It turns north and then forms a portion of the border between Mali and Senegal, before joining the Sénégal River 50 km upstream of the town of Bakel in Senegal.

Description
The Falémé River is around 650 km in length and drains a basin of 28,900 km2. Its source is in the northern part of the Fouta Djallon highlands at an altitude of 800 m. Most of the rainfall on the highlands occurs between May and October as a result of the West African Monsoon. August is normally the wettest month. The flow of the river is highly seasonal, with the maximum occurring during September and very little flow between December and June. The average annual discharge of the river over the period 1904-1984 was 6.59 km3.

Mining 
There are iron ore deposits in Senegal near the headwaters of this river. More recently there has been a gold rush around the village of Diabougou in Senegal and very near the Mali border.

References 

Rivers of Guinea
Rivers of Mali
Rivers of Senegal
Senegal River
International rivers of Africa
Mali–Senegal border
Guinea–Senegal border
Border rivers